This list covers alternative therapies for developmental and learning disabilities.  None of these therapies are supported by scientific evidence.

Bioenergy therapies

Bi-Aura therapy
Craniosacral therapy
Distant healing
Electromagnetic Field (EMF) Balancing Technique
magnetic field therapy
therapeutic touch (TT) According to the American medical association, therapeutic touch is "little more than quackery".
Thought Field Therapy (TFT)
 program practices for social development
Alexander technique
Chiropractic
Feldenkreis
Osteopathy
Physiotherapy and occupational therapy for learning disabilities
Pilates
Yoga
Zero Balancing

Dietary treatments

additive-free diets

Antifungal medication
Ayurvedic medicine
B6-magnesium treatment
Chelation therapy
fatty acids

Feingold Diet
food allergies, multiple chemical sensitivities (diet base)
Gluten-free, casein-free diet (GFCF)
glyconutritional supplement
herbal medicine
iron
lutein-free diet
megavitamins
refined sugar-free diet
secretin treatment
trace minerals, trace elements
vaccination (avoidance)
zinc

Eclectic approaches
Sunflower therapy

Hearing therapies

Auditory integration training (AIT), auditory processing training
Mozart Effect
music therapy
Spectral Activated Music of Optimal Natural Structure (SAMONAS)
The Tomatis Method

Holistic healing

Applied Kinesiology
crystal therapy
flower remedies
homeopathy
naturopathy

Medical interventions

anti-motion sickness medication and other types for Vestibular Dysfunction

Movement-based therapies
Brushing technique
Developmental Exercise Programme (inhibition of primitive reflexes)
Doman method
(Psychomotor) patterning
 Dance Movement Therapy
 Physio-Neuro Therapy

Pedagogical approaches and policies

Full inclusion
Gentle Teaching
Person Centered Approach (PCA)

Psychosocial interventions

Floortime (aka DIR)
holding therapy
TEACCH

Stress management
caffeine-free diet
Laughter therapy
meditation
positive thinking
stress management

Student profiling
Learning styles

Technological interventions

Biofeedback
Facilitated Communication
Several scientific studies have shown that facilitated communication is quackery by proving that what the Autistic patient "says" is influenced entirely by the facilitater.
Fast ForWord

Touch therapies

acupressure
acupuncture
aromatherapy

Bowen Technique
Brushing and joint compression
Emotional Freedom Technique
massage
reflexology
Reiki

Training methods

Positive behavior support (PBS)
Sensory integration therapy (SIT)
Whole Language

Visual approaches

Asfedic Tuning (TintaVision)
Coloured overlays
Dunlop test
Harris Filters
Intuitive Colorimeter
Irlen Syndrome
Optim-Eyes
Prism glasses
Tinted lenses, ChromaGen lenses
Visual Tracking Magnifier

Emerging therapies

Dolphin Assisted Therapy
Hypnotherapy
Light and Colour Therapy

References

External links
http://www.chicagotribune.com/health/chi-autism-science-nov23,0,6519404,full.story

Special education